The Olympus Zuiko Digital ED 50mm 1:2.0 Macro is an interchangeable macro lens for the Four Thirds system with 1:2 maximum magnification. It was announced by Olympus Corporation on June 24, 2003.

References

External links
 

050mm f 2.0 Macro ED
Camera lenses introduced in 2003